Ian Johnson is a public relations manager based in London, specialising in online, television and film publicity.
Since launching IJPR in 2006 the company has launched global publicity, social media and awards campaigns for shows as diverse as Killing Eve, The Crown, Call The Midwife, His Dark Materials,  Friday Night Dinner and The Missing.

IJPR Media handles social media campaigns for The Last Kingdom, His Dark Materials, A Discovery Of Witches, Bad Wolf, Left Bank Pictures, BAFTA Cymru and Dame Helen Mirren.

The company represents Bad Wolf, Big Talk, CPL, Hartswood Films, Left Bank Pictures, Neal Street Productions, New Pictures, Sid Gentle and The Imaginarium.
In the early 1990s, Johnson worked in the Channel 4 Press Office. In 1992 he was part of the launch Press Office team for Carlton Television.  From 1996 to 2001 Johnson handled publicity for LWT/Granada Television, launching Cold Feet, Popstars and unit publicity for the film Bloody Sunday. At the BBC, Johnson was Head of Publicity for Drama, Entertainment and Film from 2001 to 2004 (during which time he worked closely with Jane Tranter) and was Head Of Special Projects in Publicity from 2004 to 2006.

He founded Ian Johnson Publicity Limited in 2006. Specialising in high-end Drama including Wallander and Call the Midwife, Ian Johnson Publicity has since expanded to the United States working on programs with Starz, HBO and Showtime.

Television

 Killing Eve
 The Crown
 Penny Dreadful
 Call the Midwife
 The Hollow Crown
 Friday Night Dinner
 Long Lost Family
 A League of Their Own
 Siblings
 Youngers
 Da Vinci's Demons
 Strike Back
 Wallander
 Skins
 Rev. 
 Him & Her 
 Wallander
 Holby City
 Pushing Daisies
 School of Comedy 
 Einstein and Eddington 
 Murphy’s Law
 The Amazing Mrs Pritchard
 Goldplated
 Zen
 Jam & Jerusalem

Johnson also does corporate publicity for some of the UK's leading independent film and television production companies:

 Neal Street Productions
 Left Bank Pictures
 Hartswood Films
 CPL Productions
 Big Talk Productions

References

External links
 
 

Living people
Year of birth missing (living people)